Patricia Maria Țig (born 27 July 1994) is a Romanian tennis player.

Țig has a career-high WTA singles ranking of No. 56, achieved on 26 October 2020. Her best doubles ranking of world No. 155, she achieved on 14 November 2016. Țig has won one singles title on the WTA Tour, plus one on WTA 125 tournaments, as well as 14 singles titles and four doubles titles on the ITF Circuit. She is coached by Răzvan Sabău.

Career overview

2015: First WTA-level finals
Țig made her WTA Tour debut at the Bucharest Open where she received a wildcard into the singles main draw, and she won to Sílvia Soler Espinosa (retired at 6–4, 3–1) in the first round, before losing 0–6, 2–6 to Polona Hercog. In the doubles competition, paired to co-national Andreea Mitu, Țig reached her first WTA final, but they lost.

She then did much better in Baku by defeating Oksana Kalashnikova 6–1, 6–3 to qualify, then in the main draw, qualifiers Olga Ianchuk (6–4, 6–2) and Olga Savchuk (7–5, 6–4), and then Donna Vekić (6–3, 6–2), and in the semifinals she defeated top seed and world No. 42, Anastasia Pavlyuchenkova, 6–3, 6–2, thus reaching her first WTA singles final (without losing one set) and entering top 120 in the WTA rankings. She lost the final in three sets to Margarita Gasparyan.

2018: Inactivity status
After a period of struggling with her performances in the second half of 2017 season, she decided to focus on her health, citing back pain as the main source of discomfort. Her last played tournament was the (Guangzhou Open) in September 2017. Țig became an inactive player on 24 September 2018, after not playing for 52 consecutive weeks.

2019: Back on the ITF Circuit, return to WTA competition
Țig returned to action in April 2019, after healing her injuries and giving birth to daughter Sofia in November 2018. She played a series of nine $15k tournaments over ten weeks in Cancún, Mexico. She retired or gave her opponent a walkover in three of the first four, as the inactivity led to injuries – including a recurrence of the knee issue. By the fifth tournament, she made the final. She did the same in the seventh, and won the last two.

The Romanian would have preferred to start at the $25k level. But the new pro circuit rules instituted for 2019 made it impossible for her to gain entry with no ranking. She earned no ranking points for those results. "So we went there for nothing. I got, like, 30 points (actually, 37), which means I’m going to be around 500 (in the WTA rankings). So that doesn’t get me anywhere," she said in an interview. Țig will find them reinstated in August as the ITF partly rolls back the new circuit rules. She could gain as many as 25 more spots in the rankings when that occurs.

Țig returned to the WTA Tour at the Bucharest Open as a wildcard into qualifying. She won her three rounds of qualifying to make it to the main draw where she defeated Anna Bondár in the first round to advance to the last 16. In the second round, she defeated the top seed and defending champion Anastasija Sevastova, 6–2, 7–5. She went on to defeat Kristýna Plíšková and Laura Siegemund. In the final, she lost to Elena Rybakina. This was the second singles final in her career. She returned to rankings on July 22, at No. 264.

At the Baltic Open, where she used her protected ranking, she defeated Ankita Raina and Anhelina Kalinina, before losing to Anastasia Potapova.

Țig won the Karlsruhe Open, a WTA 125 tournament, defeating Alison Van Uytvanck and advancing back in the top 150, to No. 148.

2020: French Open third round, first WTA title & top 60 debut
After reaching semifinals at the Thailand Open, where she lost to Magda Linette, Țig reentered top 100, reaching No. 84. 

In September, she won her first WTA Tour title at Istanbul. On 26 October she reached her career-high ranking of No. 56.

Performance timelines

Only main-draw results in WTA Tour, Grand Slam tournaments, Fed Cup/Billie Jean King Cup and Olympic Games are included in win–loss records.

Singles

Current after the 2023 Australian Open.

WTA career finals

Singles: 3 (1 title, 2 runner-ups)

Doubles: 2 (2 runner-ups)

WTA 125 tournament finals

Singles: 1 title

ITF Circuit finals

Singles: 25 (15 titles, 10 runner–ups)

Doubles: 13 (5 titles, 8 runner–ups)

Notes

References

External links

 
 

Romanian female tennis players
1994 births
Living people
People from Caransebeș